The following is a timeline of the history of the city of Treviso in the Veneto region of Italy.

Prior to 14th century

 46 BCE - Tarvisium becomes a Roman municipium (approximate date).
 1st C. CE - Via Claudia Augusta (road) built in vicinity of town.
 6th C. CE - seat of a Lombard duke. 
 550 - Roman Catholic Diocese of Treviso established (approximate date).
 773 CE - Mint established (approximate date).
 776 - "Charlemagne entered Treviso."
 899 - Treviso sacked by Magyar forces.
 952 - Treviso becomes part of the Holy Roman Empire.
 1000 - Treviso Cathedral construction begins (approximate date).
 1050 -  (church) built (approximate date).
 1117 - Earthquake.
 1135 -  (cathedral library) cataloged.
 1141 - Treviso Cathedral remodelled in Romanesque style.
 1153 - Mestre-Treviso  (road) mentioned.
 1176 -  office established.
 1183 - Peace of Constance - independence from the Lombard league.  
 1217 - Palazzo dei Trecento built.
 1218 -  (tower) built.
 1219 -  expanded.
 1226 -  (monastery) established (approximate date).
 1263 - University established.
 1267 -  built.
 1269 - Palazzo del Commune built on the Piazza dei Signori.
 1270 -  (church) built.

14th-19th centuries
 1312 - "A brief republic was proclaimed in Treviso" (until 1318).
 1329 - Cangrande I della Scala in power.
 1339 - March of Treviso becomes part of the Venetian Republic.
 1346 -  (church) construction begins.
 1368 -  (church) built.
 1389 - Santa Lucia Church built.(it)
 1471 - Printing press in operation.
 1473 -  (church) built.
 1490 - Palazzo Pretorio built on the Piazza dei Signori (approximate date).
 1511 -  during the War of the League of Cambrai.
 1513 - City walls fortified.
 1516 -  (gate) built.
 1518 -  (gate) built.
 1692 - Teatro Onigo (theatre) opens
 1758 -  (church) consecrated.
 1768 - Treviso Cathedral demolished and rebuilt in Neoclassical style,
 1769 -  (library) founded.
 1797 - Treviso taken by French forces under Édouard Mortier, Duke of Trévise.
 1801 - Armistice of Treviso between France and Austria.
 1813 - Austrians in power.
 1836 - Treviso Cathedral facade remodelled.
 1848
 19 March: Austrians ousted.
 14 June: Austrian rule restored.
 1851 - Treviso Centrale railway station opens;  begins operating.
 1866 - Treviso becomes part of the Kingdom of Italy.
 1869 -  (theatre) built.
 1875 - Independence Monument erected.
 1877 -  begins operating.
 1885 -  begins operating.
 1886 -  (railway) in operation.
 1897 - Population: 36,120.

20th century

 1909 - Foot Ball Club Treviso formed.
 1910 -  begins operating.
 1911
  (theatre) opens.
 Population: 41,022.
 1917 - Treviso sacked by Austrian forces in World War I.
 1918 -  (defensive trench) built.
 1932 - Associazione Sportiva Rugby Treviso formed.
 1933 - Stadio Omobono Tenni (stadium) opens.
 1935 - Treviso Airport in use.
 1944 - Bombing of Treviso in World War II.
 1953 - Treviso Centrale railway station rebuilt.
 1973 - Stadio Comunale di Monigo (stadium) opens.
 1975 -  becomes mayor.
 1978 - La Tribuna di Treviso newspaper begins publication.

21st century

 2013
 A.C.D. Treviso 2013 (football club) formed.
 Local election held;  becomes mayor.
 Population: 82,462.
 2018: local election held; Mario Conte becomes mayor.

See also
 
 List of mayors of Treviso, 1866–present
 , 1176-1866
 List of bishops of Treviso
 
 Timeline of the Republic of Venice, of which Treviso was part 1339-1797
 Veneto history (it) (region)

Timelines of other cities in the macroregion of Northeast Italy:(it)
 Emilia-Romagna region: Timeline of Bologna; Ferrara; Forlì; Modena; Parma; Piacenza; Ravenna; Reggio Emilia; Rimini
 Friuli-Venezia Giulia region: Timeline of Trieste
 Trentino-South Tyrol region: Timeline of Trento
 Veneto region: Timeline of Padua; Venice; Verona; Vicenza

References

This article incorporates information from the Italian Wikipedia.

Bibliography

in English

in Italian

External links

 Archivio di Stato di Treviso (state archives)
 Items related to Treviso, various dates (via Europeana)
 Items related to Treviso, various dates (via Digital Public Library of America)

Treviso
Treviso
treviso